Cara Black and Liezel Huber were the defending champions, but lost in the quarterfinals to sisters Alona Bondarenko and Kateryna Bondarenko.

The sisters won in the final 2–6, 6–1, 6–4, against Victoria Azarenka and Shahar Pe'er.

Seeds

Draw

Finals

Top half

Section 1

Section 2

Bottom half

Section 3

Section 4

External links
 2008 Australian Open – Women's draws and results at the International Tennis Federation

Women's Doubles
Australian Open (tennis) by year – Women's doubles
2008 in Australian women's sport